The W.J. White House is a historic house at 1412 West Main Street in Russellville, Arkansas.  It is a -story brick structure, covered by a pressed tin roof that resembles tile.  A single-story porch curves gracefully across the front and around to both sides, supported by clustered round columns, with spindlework valances between them, and a stone balustrade below.  Built in 1908, it is a distinctive and eclectic blend of Queen Anne and Craftsman styling.

The house was listed on the National Register of Historic Places in 1978.

See also
National Register of Historic Places listings in Pope County, Arkansas

References

Houses on the National Register of Historic Places in Arkansas
National Register of Historic Places in Pope County, Arkansas
Queen Anne architecture in Arkansas
Houses completed in 1908
Houses in Pope County, Arkansas
1908 establishments in Arkansas
Buildings and structures in Russellville, Arkansas
American Craftsman architecture in Arkansas